The All Nigeria Peoples Party (abbr. ANPP) was a political party in Nigeria.

Under the leadership of Late Chief Edwin Ume-Ezeoke who was its vice presidential candidate to General Muhammadu Buhari in the 2007 presidential elections. The party won a paltry 32.2% of the vote behind ruling People's Democratic Party (PDP). Buhari was the ANPP candidate in the 2003 presidential election, with Chuba Okadigbo as the running mate taking second place and about 18% of the vote according to official results.

The party assumed a new leadership following its September 2010 national convention in Abuja. A successful convention was held at Eagle Square under the leadership of Yobe State Governor Alhaji Ibrahim Gaidam, where former Governor of Abia Chief Dr. Christopher Ogbunnaya Onu emerged as the National Chairman of the party. Other national officers are Hon. lawan Shettima Ali (National Secretary), Mr. Wale Olatunji (Deputy National Secretary), Chief John Oyegun (Deputy National Chairman, South), Dr. Yusuf Musa (Deputy National Chairman, North), Hajjia Ramatu Tijjani Aliyu (National Women's Leader), Tony Udoakan (National Youth Leader), Emma Eneukwu (National Publicity Secretary), and Hajjia Fatima Muhammed (National Financial Secretary).

The ANPP was a household party in the extreme north of Nigeria, primarily due to its mass appeal among more religious voters. It was the strongest opposition party, controlling seven of the nation's thirty-six states at one point. The party's biggest achievement in the 2003 election was its gubernatorial victory in Kano State where it defeated the ruling People's Democratic Party (PDP) to take control of one of the country's most populous states.

Following the 2007 election, the ANPP challenged the victory of Umaru Yar'Adua and his PDP, although it was announced on 27 June 2007 following talks, that the ANPP had agreed to join Yar'Adua's government of national unity. There was reportedly disagreement within the ANPP about the talks. Buhari subsequently denounced the idea in a BBC interview and suggested that the decision was only made by part of the party, alleging that they were "just looking for jobs for themselves".

In February 2013, the party merged with the Action Congress of Nigeria, the All Progressives Grand Alliance, and the Congress for Progressive Change to form the All Progressives Congress.

Political ideology
The ANPP is a conservative party with mass appeal among more religious voters. The party draws its strength predominantly from Northern Nigeria.

Earlier incarnation
There was a party of the same name during the Second Republic, which was banned following the military coup of 1983 led by General Buhari.

The current party (founded in 1999) shares the same name, but with little or no resemblance, affinity, or affiliation to the original ANPP.

Electoral history

Presidential elections

House of Representative and Senate elections

See also
All People's Party (Nigeria)
All Progressives Congress

References

ANPP USA (cached site from archive.org)
CIA Factbook - Nigeria

1998 establishments in Nigeria
2013 disestablishments in Nigeria
Conservative parties in Nigeria
Defunct political parties in Nigeria
Islamic democratic political parties
Political parties disestablished in 2013
Political parties established in 1998
Social conservative parties